Chalk Hill is an unincorporated community in Rusk County, located in the U.S. state of Texas. According to the Handbook of Texas, the community had a population of 200 in 2000. It is located within the Longview, Texas metropolitan area.

History
The area in what is known as Chalk Hill today was first settled around 1875. It had a store and only 25 residents in the 1940s. The National Weather Service established a radar site in Chalk Hill to forecast weather in the area in 1978. Its population was 200 in 2000.

Geography

Education
Today, the community is served by the Tatum Independent School District.

Media
 KEBE
 KDOK

Notes

Unincorporated communities in Cherokee County, Texas
Unincorporated communities in Texas